Jambangkunda Forest Park is a forest park in the Gambia. It covers 356 hectares. It was founded in 1954.

References

Forest parks of the Gambia